Carmel Junior College, Sonari is an English Medium Co-educational School, conducted by the Sisters of the Apostolic Carmel Congregation. The congregation of the Apostolic Carmel has several schools in India and abroad in which young people belonging to every creed, social class, community and linguistic group are educated through the medium of English and the regional languages. These institutions are part of the Catholic Church’s effort to share in the country’s educational endeavour. This effort, while particularly responsible to the Christian community, the school welcomes applicants from all creeds and beliefs.

History 
Carmel Junior College is a Christian School established and administered by the congregation of the Apostolic Carmel Sisters in the Catholic Church. The school is under the religious jurisdiction of the Bishop of Jamshedpur. The school was opened on 3 March 1997. It was founded by Sister Flavian AC at Bal Vihar, Sonari.

Curriculum
The medium of instruction is English but emphasis is given to Hindi, the national language, together with the essential subjects : Sanskrit, History, Geography, Social studies, Mathematics, Physics, Chemistry, Biology, Physical Training, Computer Application, Economics Application, and Fine Arts. The school has laboratories for science, modern computer Labs and libraries.

Extracurricular activities 
The school offers a wide range of activities. The school fields Football, Cricket, Volleyball, Handball and Basketball teams in all the inter-school competitions. Members of these teams have represented the district and state several times over the years. As all schools have activities (co-Curricular activities) are no longer part of its regular classes expect for important inter-school activities.

Students also participate in chess tournaments, and each year the school hosts a Grandparents Day and a dance contest.
 
The school organises the following inter-school events: 

However, only biblica and Carmel Summit are fixed annual events while others happen at sporadically.

Clubs  
All ventures have been divided into clubs. The school has four active clubs. The clubs are led by a President, assisted by a Vice- President and are guided by at least two teacher moderators.

Publications 
The school's first publication is "The Seed was Sown." The School also had several other minor publications like "Soldiers of God". However, from 2013 the school started its annual magazine "The Third Eye".

References 

 http://www.tatasteelindia.com/media/tatasteel_news/tisconewsarchive/issue_01_07-08/page_08.htm
 http://www.baldrige21.com/Baldrige%20INTERNATIONAL/Baldrige%20India.html
 http://www.avenuemail.in/jamshedpur/carmel-wins-fourth-place-in-asset-management-contest-in-usa/74991/
 
 
 
 
 
 
 
 http://www.avenuemail.in/jamshedpur/carmel-junior-college-and-hill-top-school-win-international-school-award/13817/
 http://www.avenuemail.in/jamshedpur/carmel-school-in-finals-of-wharton-university-investment-competition/73422/
 
 http://www.avenuemail.in/jamshedpur/carmel-junior-launches-crusade-child-sex-abuse/62771/
 http://inextlive.jagran.com/nishi-chali-cambridge-ke-our-201201110018
 
 http://www.avenuemail.in/jamshedpur/carmel-junior-college-student-makes-it-in-google-science-fair/77940/
 http://www.globalschoolsnews.org/global-schools/Media-Spotlight-on-GIIS-IB-World-Topper-Nishi-Anand
 

Carmelite educational institutions
Catholic schools in India
Christian schools in Jharkhand
Educational institutions established in 1997
1997 establishments in Bihar